Yusi is a town in Fuxin Mongol Autonomous County, Fuxin, Liaoning province, China. , it has eleven villages under its administration: 
Yusi Village 
Guilinshutai Village
Ping'andi Village
Balipu Village
Zhalanboluo Village
Huzhanggou Village
Mangniuwa Village
Yangjiawopu Village
Guanyingzi Village
Tabengai Village
Shalitu Village

See also 
 List of township-level divisions of Liaoning

References 

Township-level divisions of Liaoning
Fuxin Mongol Autonomous County